Cote is a surname. Notable people with the surname include:

Brandin Cote, Canadian NHL player
David Cote (disambiguation), several people
Denise Cote, a U.S. federal judge
Michael R. Cote, CEO of SecureWorks
Michael Richard Cote, Roman Catholic bishop in USA
Ray Cote, Canadian NHL player
Riley Cote, Canadian NHL player
Patrick Cote (fighter), Canadian mixed martial artist

See also
Côté (surname)